Horní Loučky is a municipality and village in Brno-Country District in the South Moravian Region of the Czech Republic. It has about 300 inhabitants.

History
The first written mention of Horní Loučky is from 1353.

References

Villages in Brno-Country District